Henry Bulstrode (28 December 1578 – August 1643) was an English politician who sat in the House of Commons in 1614 and 1625.

Bulstrode was the eldest son of Edward Bulstrode of Upton, Buckinghamshire and matriculated at University College, Oxford on 15 December 1592, aged 13. In 1595, he was a student of the Inner Temple.

In 1614, he was elected Member of Parliament (MP) for Helston, Cornwall and, in 1625, elected MP for Buckinghamshire. He was a justice of the peace for Buckinghamshire from 1618 until his death and appointed High Sheriff of Buckinghamshire for 1631–32. During the Civil War he was briefly Governor of Aylesbury and Henley for the Parliamentary forces, in which he was a Colonel of a foot regiment. Bulstrode died in August 1643, aged 64, and was buried in the family vault at Upton.

References

Sources

1578 births
1632 deaths
Alumni of University College, Oxford
Members of the Inner Temple
English MPs 1614
English MPs 1625
Members of the pre-1707 English Parliament for constituencies in Cornwall
High Sheriffs of Buckinghamshire
Parliamentarian military personnel of the English Civil War